This is a list of cities and towns in Paraguay with population over 10,000, sorted by population. Capital cities of the departments are listed in bold text. All census totals come from the Department of Statistics, Surveys and Censuses (Paraguay)



Overall

By department

See also 
List of cities in Paraguay

References 

Paraguay
Demographics of Paraguay
 
Cities and towns by population
Paraguay